Antipodophlebia asthenes is a species of dragonfly of the family Telephlebiidae,
commonly known as the terrestrial evening darner. 
It is a medium-sized dragonfly with dull colouring.
It is endemic to eastern Australia where it has been found flying low to the ground at dusk.

Antipodophlebia asthenes is the only species of the genus Antipodophlebia.

Gallery

See also
 List of Odonata species of Australia

References

Telephlebiidae
Odonata of Australia
Endemic fauna of Australia
Taxa named by Robert John Tillyard
Insects described in 1916